Eleanor Elizabeth Bamber (born 2 February 1997) is an English actress. She won third prize at the Ian Charleson Awards for her 2017 performance in The Lady from the Sea at the Donmar Warehouse. On television, she is known for her roles in the BBC series Les Misérables (2018), The Trial of Christine Keeler (2019–2020), and The Serpent (2021), and the Disney+ series Willow (2022).

She appeared in Tom Ford's film Nocturnal Animals (2016).

Early life
Bamber was born in Surrey, England, and has a younger brother, Lucas. Her father, David, works in finance and her mother, Zoe, is her manager. She was educated at Hawley Place School (Hurst Lodge School), and was awarded a drama scholarship.

Career

Theatre
At the age of 12, Bamber became the youngest member of the Players' Theatre Club. At the age of 13 she was chosen by Sir Trevor Nunn to play the role of ‘Young Jenny’ in his production of Aspects of Love at the Menier Chocolate Factory. After roles in TV and film, she returned to musical theatre when she was selected for a lead role as the disruptive teenager ‘Dinah Lord’ in High Society at The Old Vic, London. Directed by Maria Friedman, this was the last production under Kevin Spacey’s tenure as Artistic Director. Following the run, in November 2015, she was nominated for the ‘Evening Standard Theatre Award’ for ‘Best Newcomer in a Musical’.

In 2017 she played Hilde in The Lady from the Sea, directed by Kwame Kwei-Armah at the Donmar Warehouse, and her performance won third prize at the Ian Charleson Awards.

Television and film
Bamber's film debut was in the BBC film The Falling (2014). In the same year she starred as Lydia Bennet, the youngest of the Bennet sisters in Pride and Prejudice and Zombies, starring alongside Lily James, Douglas Booth, Sam Riley and Matt Smith. 

In 2015, Bamber was chosen as one of the British Film Institute and Screen Daily – Screen Stars of Tomorrow. 

In 2016, she appeared in Tom Ford's Nocturnal Animals, playing the daughter of Jake Gyllenhaal and Isla Fisher's characters, in a film also starring Amy Adams. Also that year, she filmed the feature film Extracurricular Activities. 

In 2017, she also filmed High Resolution based on the book Taipei by Tao Lin. The same year, Bamber appeared in the music video for Shawn Mendes' song "There's Nothing Holdin' Me Back". In 2018 Bamber was in The Nutcracker and the Four Realms, alongside Keira Knightley and Morgan Freeman. In 2018, Bamber played the lead role of Mary in the feature film The Seven Sorrows of Mary.

In 2019, Bamber played Cosette in the BBC 1 television series Les Misérables with Dominic West and Olivia Colman. She starred in the BBC 1 television series, The Trial of Christine Keeler as Mandy Rice-Davies alongside Sophie Cookson and James Norton and had a leading role in the acclaimed 2021 BBC drama series The Serpent.

In 2022, she stars as Dove/Elora Danan in Willow, the Disney+ sequel to the 1988 film of the same name.

Filmography

Stage

Awards and nominations

References

External links
 
 
 https://disneyplusoriginals.disney.com/show/willow

1997 births
21st-century English actresses
English film actresses
Living people
Actresses from Surrey
English stage actresses
English television actresses
People educated at Eagle House School